In mathematics and physics, vector notation is a commonly used notation for representing  vectors, which may be Euclidean vectors, or more generally, members of a vector space.

In advanced mathematics, vectors are often represented in a simple italic type, like any variable.

History
In 1835 Giusto Bellavitis introduced the idea of equipollent directed line segments  which resulted  in the concept of a vector as an equivalence class of such  segments.

The term vector was coined by W. R. Hamilton around 1843, as he revealed quaternions, a system which uses vectors and scalars to span a four-dimensional space. For a quaternion q = a + bi + cj + dk, Hamilton used two projections: S q = a, for the scalar part of q, and V q = bi + cj + dk, the vector part. Using the modern terms cross product (×) and dot product (.), the quaternion product of two vectors p and q can be written pq = –p.q + p×q. In 1878, W. K. Clifford severed the two products to make the quaternion operation useful for students in his textbook Elements of Dynamic. Lecturing at Yale University, Josiah Willard Gibbs supplied notation for the scalar product and vector products, which was introduced in Vector Analysis.

In 1891, Oliver Heaviside argued for Clarendon to distinguish vectors from scalars. He criticized the use of Greek letters by Tait and Gothic letters by Maxwell.

In 1912, J.B. Shaw contributed his "Comparative Notation for Vector Expressions" to the Bulletin of the Quaternion Society. Subsequently, Alexander Macfarlane described 15 criteria for clear expression with vectors in the same publication.

Vector ideas were advanced by Hermann Grassmann in 1841, and again in 1862 in the German language. But German mathematicians were not taken with quaternions as much as were English-speaking mathematicians. When Felix Klein was organizing the German mathematical encyclopedia, he assigned Arnold Sommerfeld to standardize vector notation. In 1950, when Academic Press published G. Kuerti’s translation of the second edition of volume 2 of Lectures on Theoretical Physics by Sommerfeld, vector notation was the subject of a footnote: "In the original German text, vectors and their components are printed in the same Gothic types. The more usual way of making a typographical distinction between the two has been adopted for this translation."

Rectangular vectors

A rectangular vector is a coordinate vector specified by components that define a rectangle (or rectangular prism in three dimensions, and similar shapes in greater dimensions).  The starting point and terminal point of the vector lie at opposite ends of the rectangle (or prism, etc.).

Ordered set notation
A rectangular vector in  can be specified using an ordered set of components, enclosed in either parentheses or angle brackets.

In a general sense, an n-dimensional vector v can be specified in either of the following forms:

Where v1, v2, …, vn − 1, vn are the components of v.

Matrix notation
A rectangular vector in  can also be specified as a row or column matrix containing the ordered set of components. A vector specified as a row matrix is known as a row vector; one specified as a column matrix is known as a column vector.

Again, an n-dimensional vector  can be specified in either of the following forms using matrices:

where v1, v2, …, vn − 1, vn are the components of v. In some advanced contexts, a row and a column vector have different meaning; see covariance and contravariance of vectors for more.

Unit vector notation

A three-dimensional vector  can be specified in the following form, using unit vector notation:

Where vx, vy, and vz are the scalar components of v. Scalar components may be positive or negative; the absolute value of a scalar component is its magnitude.

Polar vectors
 

The two polar coordinates of a point in a plane may be considered as a two dimensional vector. Such a polar vector consists of a magnitude (or length) and a direction (or angle). The magnitude, typically represented as r, is the distance from a starting point, the origin, to the point which is represented. The angle, typically represented as θ (the Greek letter theta), is the angle, usually measured , between a fixed direction, typically that of the positive x-axis, and the direction from the origin to the point.

It must be emphasized that a polar vector is not really a vector, since the addition of two polar vectors is not defined.

Ordered set and matrix notations
Polar vectors can be specified using either ordered pair notation (a subset of ordered set notation using only two components), or matrix notation, as with rectangular vectors. In these forms, the first component of the vector is r (instead of v1), and the second component is θ (instead of v2). To differentiate polar vectors from rectangular vectors, the angle may be prefixed with the angle symbol, .

A two-dimensional polar vector v can be represented as any of the following, using either ordered pair or matrix notation:

where r is the magnitude, θ is the angle, and the angle symbol is optional.

Direct notation
Polar vectors can also be specified using simplified autonomous equations that define r and θ explicitly. This can be unwieldy, but is useful for avoiding the confusion with two-dimensional rectangular vectors that arises from using ordered pair or matrix notation.

A two-dimensional vector whose magnitude is 5 units, and whose direction is π/9 radians (20°), can be specified using either of the following forms:

Cylindrical vectors

A cylindrical vector is an extension of the concept of polar vectors into three dimensions. It is akin to an arrow in the cylindrical coordinate system. A cylindrical vector is specified by a distance in the xy-plane, an angle, and a distance from the xy-plane (a height). The first distance, usually represented as r or ρ (the Greek letter rho), is the magnitude of the projection of the vector onto the xy-plane.  The angle, usually represented as θ or φ (the Greek letter phi), is measured as the offset from the line collinear with the x-axis in the positive direction; the angle is typically reduced to lie within the range . The second distance, usually represented as h or z, is the distance from the xy-plane to the endpoint of the vector.

Ordered set and matrix notations
Cylindrical vectors are specified like polar vectors, where the second distance component is concatenated as a third component to form ordered triplets (again, a subset of ordered set notation) and matrices.  The angle may be prefixed with the angle symbol; the distance-angle-distance combination distinguishes cylindrical vectors in this notation from spherical vectors in similar notation.

A three-dimensional cylindrical vector v can be represented as any of the following, using either ordered triplet or matrix notation:

Where r is the magnitude of the projection of v onto the xy-plane, θ is the angle between the positive x-axis and v, and h is the height from the xy-plane to the endpoint of v.  Again, the angle symbol is optional.

Direct notation
A cylindrical vector can also be specified directly, using simplified autonomous equations that define r (or ρ), θ (or φ), and h (or z).  Consistency should be used when choosing the names to use for the variables; ρ should not be mixed with θ and so on.

A three-dimensional vector, the magnitude of whose projection onto the xy-plane is 5 units, whose angle from the positive x-axis is π/9 radians (20°), and whose height from the xy-plane is 3 units can be specified in any of the following forms:

Spherical vectors

A spherical vector is another method for extending the concept of polar vectors into three dimensions.  It is akin to an arrow in the spherical coordinate system.  A spherical vector is specified by a magnitude, an azimuth angle, and a zenith angle.  The magnitude is usually represented as ρ.  The azimuth angle, usually represented as θ, is the  offset from the positive x-axis.  The zenith angle, usually represented as φ, is the offset from the positive z-axis.  Both angles are typically reduced to lie within the range from zero (inclusive) to 2π (exclusive).

Ordered set and matrix notations
Spherical vectors are specified like polar vectors, where the zenith angle is concatenated as a third component to form ordered triplets and matrices.  The azimuth and zenith angles may be both prefixed with the angle symbol; the prefix should be used consistently to produce the distance-angle-angle combination that distinguishes spherical vectors from cylindrical ones.

A three-dimensional spherical vector v can be represented as any of the following, using either ordered triplet or matrix notation:

Where ρ is the magnitude, θ is the azimuth angle, and φ is the zenith angle.

Direct notation
Like polar and cylindrical vectors, spherical vectors can be specified using simplified autonomous equations, in this case for ρ, θ, and φ.

A three-dimensional vector whose magnitude is 5 units, whose azimuth angle is π/9 radians (20°), and whose zenith angle is π/4 radians (45°) can be specified as:

Operations
In any given vector space, the operations of vector addition and scalar multiplication are defined. Normed vector spaces also define an operation known as the norm (or determination of magnitude). Inner product spaces also define an operation known as the inner product. In , the inner product is known as the dot product.

Vector addition
Vector addition is represented with the plus sign used as an operator between two vectors.  The sum of two vectors u and v would be represented as:

Scalar multiplication
Scalar multiplication is represented in the same manners as algebraic multiplication. A scalar beside a vector (either or both of which may be in parentheses) implies scalar multiplication. The two common operators, a dot and a rotated cross, are also acceptable (although the rotated cross is almost never used), but they risk confusion with dot products and cross products, which operate on two vectors. The product of a scalar k with a vector v can be represented in any of the following fashions:

Vector subtraction and scalar division
Using the algebraic properties of subtraction and division, along with scalar multiplication, it is also possible to “subtract” two vectors and “divide” a vector by a scalar.

Vector subtraction is performed by adding the scalar multiple of −1 with the second vector operand to the first vector operand.  This can be represented by the use of the minus sign as an operator. The difference between two vectors u and v can be represented in either of the following fashions:

Scalar division is performed by multiplying the vector operand with the numeric inverse of the scalar operand. This can be represented by the use of the fraction bar or division signs as operators. The quotient of a vector v and a scalar c can be represented in any of the following forms:

Norm
The norm of a vector is represented with double bars on both sides of the vector.  The norm of a vector v can be represented as: 

The norm is also sometimes represented with single bars, like , but this can be confused with absolute value (which is a type of norm).

Inner product
The inner product of two vectors (also known as the scalar product, not to be confused with scalar multiplication) is represented as an ordered pair enclosed in angle brackets. The inner product of two vectors u and v would be represented as:

Dot product
In , the inner product is also known as the dot product. In addition to the standard inner product notation, the dot product notation (using the dot as an operator) can also be used (and is more common). The dot product of two vectors u and v can be represented as: 

In some older literature, the dot product is implied between two vectors written side-by-side. This notation can be confused with the dyadic product between two vectors.

Cross product
The cross product of two vectors (in ) is represented using the rotated cross as an operator. The cross product of two vectors u and v would be represented as: 

By some conventions (e.g. in France and in some areas of higher mathematics), this is also denoted by a wedge, which avoids confusion with the wedge product since the two are functionally equivalent in three dimensions:

In some older literature, the following notation is used for the cross product between u and v:

Nabla

Vector notation is used with calculus through the Nabla operator:

With a scalar function f, the gradient is written as 

with a vector field, F the divergence is written as 

and with a vector field, F the curl is written as

See also
 Euclidean vector
 
 Phasor

References

Mathematical notation
Vectors (mathematics and physics)